This is a list of ambient music artists. This includes artists who have either been very important to the genre or have had a considerable amount of exposure (such as those who have been on a major label). This list does not include little-known local artists. Artists are listed by the first letter in their name (not including the words "a", "an", or "the"), and individuals are listed by last name.

0–9
 2002
 2814
 3rd Force

A
 Philip Aaberg
 William Ackerman
 Adiemus
 Rudy Adrian
 Air
 Airiel
 The Album Leaf
 Giulio Aldinucci
 The Aloof
 Ambeon
 Amethystium
 The American Dollar
 Aphex Twin
 Archive
 Diane Arkenstone
 Craig Armstrong
 Ólafur Arnalds
 Ash Ra Tempel
 Atom Heart
 Augustine Leudar
 Australis
 Autechre
 Marvin Ayres
 Sara Ayers

B
 William Basinski
 Bad Sector
 Wally Badarou
 Julianna Barwick
 Bass Communion
 Peter Baumann
 David Bowie (On Low and "Heroes")
 Biosphere
 Bliss
 Boards of Canada
 Bohren & der Club of Gore
 Richard Bone
 Booka Shade
 Bonobo
 Bowery Electric
 Thom Brennan
 Michael Brook
 Brunette Models
 Buckethead (trance-ambient)
 Harold Budd
 Peter Buffett
 Burial
 Burzum (not exclusively ambient)
 Ray Buttigieg
 Blue Foundation

C
 C418
 Carbon Based Lifeforms
 The Caretaker
 Cat System Corp.
 Wendy Carlos
 Clifford Carter (member of James Taylor's band)
 centrozoon
 Craig Chaquico
 Suzanne Ciani
 Cluster
 Cocteau Twins
 Coil
 B.J. Cole (pedal steel guitarist)
 Colleen
 Conjure One, headed by Rhys Fulber
 Controlled Bleeding
 Holger Czukay
 Christ.
 Chuck Wild

D
 Malcolm Dalglish
 David Darling
 Darshan Ambient
 David Jolley
 Dead Can Dance
 Dead Texan, The
 deadmau5
 Death Ambient
 Death Cube K
 Deathprod
 Deep Forest
 Deerhunter
 De Facto
 Delerium
 Constance Demby
 Stuart Dempster
 Taylor Deupree
 Deuter
 Deutsch Nepal
 DJ Spooky
 Kurt Doles
 Dntel
 Suzanne Doucet
 dreamSTATE
 Kyle Bobby Dunn

E
 Earth
 Earthstar
 Danielle Egnew
 Ludovico Einaudi
 Eluvium
 Emerald Web
 Emeralds
 Justin Emerle
 Enigma
 Brian Eno
 Roger Eno
 Enya
 Karlheinz Essl
 Dean Evenson
 Explosions In The Sky

F
 Don Falcone
 Falling Up
 Falling You
 Fantomas
 Ryan Farish
 Florian-Ayala Fauna
 Christian Fennesz
 The Field
 The Fireman
 Jim Fox
 Christopher Franke
 Freescha
 Robert Fripp
 Eloy Fritsch
 Edgar Froese
 Ben Frost
 Frou Frou
 Future Sound of London / Amorphous Androgynous

G
 Peter Gabriel
 Roopam Garg
 Gas
 Gaudi
 Philip Glass
 Global Communication
 Goldfrapp
 Manuel Gottsching
 Nicholas Gunn
 Guru Guru
 Guy Gerber

H
 Rob Haigh
 Halo Manash
 Peter Michael Hamel
 Hammock
 Harmonia
 Jon Hassell
 Chihei Hatakeyama
 Imogen Heap
 Tom Heasley
 Tim Hecker
 Michael Hedges
 David Helpling
 Higher Intelligence Agency
 Susumu Hirasawa
 Ezekiel Honig
 Hwyl Nofio

I
 Iasos
 I.E.M.
 In-Existence (Maarten van der Vleuten)
 Inon Zur
 Tetsu Inoue
 Rafael Anton Irisarri
 Irresistible Force
 Mark Isham

J
 Jacaszek
 Jean Michel Jarre
 Job Karma
 Jonn Serrie
 Jónsi & Alex
 Mat Jarvis
 Karl Jenkins
 Jeff Johnson
 Jóhann Jóhannsson
 Michael Jones
 Bradley Joseph
 Journeyman

K
 Karunesh
 Kátai Tamás
 Peter Kater
 Kevin Keller
 Kevin Kern
 King Never
 Paddy Kingsland
 Kitaro
 The KLF
 Thomas Köner
 Kraftwerk
 Andrei Krylov
 Paul Kuniholm

L
 Labradford
 Daniel Lanois
 David Lanz
 Laraaji
 Bill Laswell
 Thomas Leer
 Ottmar Liebert
 Lights Out Asia
 Lightwave
 Loscil
 Lotus Plaza
 Lull
 Lusine
 Lustmord
 Ray Lynch

M
 M83
 Maeror Tri
 Main
 Mana ERG
 Mannheim Steamroller
 Marconi Union
 Catya Maré
 Keiko Matsui
 Max and Harvey
 Paul McCandless
 Loreena McKennitt
 Billy McLaughlin
 Riad Michael
 Michna
 Robert Miles
 Robyn Miller
 Mirror System
 Moby
 Moodswings
 The Moon Lay Hidden Beneath a Cloud
 Morgenstern
 Rob Mounsey
 Murcof
 Robert ÆOLUS Myers
 Mythos

N
 R. Carlos Nakai (Native American flutist)
 Pete Namlook
 Andy Narell
 The Necks
 Neptune Towers
 Loren Nerell
 Neu!
 New Order (not exclusively ambient)
 Nightnoise
 Nine Inch Nails (not exclusively ambient)
 No-Man
 Alva Noto (Carsten Nicolai)
 Michael Nyman

O
 Vidna Obmana
 Obsil
 Ochre
 Odd Nosdam
 Patrick O'Hearn
 Mike Oldfield
 Coyote Oldman
 Omar Rodriguez Lopez
 Ombient
 Omni Trio
 On! Air! Library!
 The Orb
 William Orbit (Strange Cargo series)
 Orbital
 O Yuki Conjugate
 Ott

P
 Craig Padilla
 Panda Bear
 Jeff Pearce
 Pendulum
 Phish (The Siket Disc in particular)
 Pink Floyd
 Pivot
 Plastikman
 Popol Vuh
 Poppy
 Porcupine Tree
 Puff Dragon
 Port Blue

R
 Rabbit in the Moon
 Radiohead (Kid A)
 Radio Massacre International
 Raison D'être
 Raphael
 Red
 Robert Rich
 Robin Guthrie
 Max Richter
 Terry Riley
 Francis Rimbert
 Steve Roach
 Kim Robertson
 Hans-Joachim Roedelius
 Rothko
 Rurutia
 Röyksopp

S
 Saafi Brothers
 Ryuichi Sakamoto
 Karl Sanders
 Bruno Sanfilippo
 Devin Sarno
 Erik Satie
 Janek Schaefer
 Conrad Schnitzler
 Klaus Schulze
 Scorn
 Shadowfax
 Andrew Shapiro
 Jonah Sharp
 Rhian Sheehan
 Shpongle
 Shulman
 Michael Shrieve
 The Sight Below
 Sigur Rós
 Single Cell Orchestra
 Slow Meadow
 Kaitlyn Aurelia Smith
 Software
 Spiral Realms
 Gary Stadler
 Stars of the Lid
 Stars Over Foy
 Michael Stearns
 Solar Fields
 Sunn O)))

T
 Henrik Takkenberg
 Hirokazu Tanaka
 Tangerine Dream
 Benson Taylor
 Team Sleep
 Irv Teibel
 Telefon Tel Aviv
 Mark Templeton
 Terre Thaemlitz
 Robert Scott Thompson
 TimeShard
 Amon Tobin
 Devin Townsend
 Tipper
 Troum
 Tuu
 Thom Brennan
 Thomas Newman
 Tycho
 theta
 Trepaneringsritualen

U
 Ulrich Schnauss
 The Ultraviolet Catastrophe
 Ulver
 Underworld

V
 Vangelis
 Velvet Cacoon
 Luke Vibert (as Wagon Christ)
 Voice of Eye

W
 Kit Watkins
 Wavestar (with John Dyson)
 Carl Weingarten
 White Noise
 Steven Wilson
 Windy & Carl
 Paul Winter
 Paul Winter Consort
 Jah Wobble
 Erik Wøllo
 Woob

Y
 Yanni
 Yellow Magic Orchestra
 Susumu Yokota
 Young American Primitive

Z
 Zero 7
 Zoviet France

References

Ambient